The boulevardier cocktail is an alcoholic drink composed of whiskey, sweet vermouth, and Campari. Its creation is ascribed to Erskine Gwynne, an American-born writer who founded a monthly magazine in Paris called Boulevardier, which appeared from 1927 to 1932.

The boulevardier is similar to a Negroni, sharing two of its three ingredients. It is differentiated by its use of bourbon whiskey or rye whiskey  as its principal component instead of gin.

Recipes vary the proportions of its components. Some boulevardier recipes call for  parts rather than 1 part whiskey, or call for two parts bourbon to one part vermouth and one part Campari.

See also
 Old pal (cocktail), a variant made with rye whiskey and dry vermouth

Notes

References

Cocktails with Campari
Cocktails with vermouth
Cocktails with whisky